The 2022 Coppa Sabatini (also known as the Gran Premio città di Peccioli) was the 70th edition of the Coppa Sabatini road cycling one day race, which was held on 15 September 2022 as part of the 2022 UCI ProSeries calendar.

Teams 
Ten of the 19 UCI WorldTeams, four UCI ProTeams, five UCI Continental teams made up the nineteen teams that participated in the race. Only 46 riders finished the race.

UCI WorldTeams

 
 
 
 
 
 
 
 
 
 

UCI ProTeams

 
 
 
 

UCI Continental Teams

Result

References

Sources

External links 
  

Coppa Sabatini
Coppa Sabatini
Coppa Sabatini
Coppa Sabatini